An aerostat is an aircraft that remains aloft through the use of lighter-than-air gases. A narrower and more technical meaning refers only to tethered balloons.

Aerostat may also refer to:

Types of aerostat

Airships
Airships are powered aerostats.
 Airship, or dirigible, any aerostat that can be manoeuvred through the air using propellers, rudders, etc.
 Blimp, an airship with no structural framework, using only gas pressure to maintain its shape
 Rigid airship, uses only a structural framework to maintain its shape
 Semi-rigid airship, uses a partial structural framework in combination with gas pressure to maintain its shape

Balloons
Balloons are unpowered aerostats.
 Balloon (aircraft)
 Gas balloon
 Hot air balloon
 Vacuum balloon

Tethered
The term aerostat is sometimes used to refer specifically to tethered balloons, to the exclusion of other types. Sub-types include:
 Barrage balloon
 Observation balloon

Untethered
 Espionage balloon
 Fire balloon

Hybrids
Hybrids combine aerostatic buoyancy and aerodynamic lift.

Powered
 Hybrid airship

Unpowered
 Kytoon

Other uses
 Tethered Aerostat Radar System
 Akashdeep Aerostat
 RT Aerostats Systems

See also
 
 
 Aerostatics
 Balloon
 Sky lantern